Dead Souls is a 2018 documentary film directed by Wang Bing and documents the testimony of survivors of the hard-labor camp in the Gobi Desert in Gansu, China. Shot from 2005 to 2017, the film covers most of China's provinces with visits to more than 120 survivors of the Jiabiangou and Mingshui reeducation camps set up by China's Communist regime in the late 1950s. It made its world premiere at the 2018 Cannes Film Festival.

References

External links
 
 
 
Dead Souls at Festival de Cannes website 

Chinese documentary films
2018 films
2018 documentary films
Films directed by Wang Bing
2010s Mandarin-language films